The  was a Japanese domain of the Edo period, located in Yamato Province (modern-day Uda, Nara). It was ruled for most of its history by the Oda clan.

The domain was disbanded in 1695, when the last lord, Oda Nobuyasu, was moved to the Tanba-Kaibara Domain, and his income reduced to 20,000 koku.

List of lords

Fukushima clan, 1600-1615 (Tozama; 31,717 koku)

Takaharu

Oda clan, 1615-1695 (Tozama; 28,000 koku)

Nobukatsu
Takanaga
Nagayori
Nobutake
Nobuyasu

References
 Uda-Matsuyama on "Edo 300 HTML" (4 Nov. 2007)

Domains of Japan
Uda, Nara